Merophyas therina is a moth of the family Tortricidae. It is known from Australia, including the Australian Capital Territory and Tasmania. The habitat ranges from wet eucalypt forests to open montane forests.

The wingspan is about 15 mm. Adults have pale brown forewings, with a brown spotted diagonal band across each wing. The hindwings are pale brown and have a recurved apex.

The larvae feed on Acaena anserinifolia.

References

Moths described in 1910
Archipini